Vita Mateshik (born 12 February 1969) is a retired Ukrainian female volleyball player.

She was part of the Ukraine women's national volleyball team at the 1996 Summer Olympics, and at the 1994 FIVB Women's Volleyball World Championship. On club level she played with Orbita Zaporizhya.

Clubs
 Orbita Zaporizhya (1994)

References

External links
 
 
 

1969 births
Living people
Ukrainian women's volleyball players
Olympic volleyball players of Ukraine
Volleyball players at the 1996 Summer Olympics
Place of birth missing (living people)